The Minister of Home Affairs (or simply, the Home Minister, short-form HM) is the head of the Ministry of Home Affairs of the Government of India. One of the senior-most officers in the Union Cabinet, the chief responsibility of the Home Minister is the maintenance of India's internal security; the country's large police force comes under its jurisdiction. Occasionally, they are assisted by the Minister of State of Home Affairs and the lower-ranked Deputy Minister of Home Affairs.

Ever since the time of independent India's first Home Minister, Sardar Vallabhbhai Patel, the office has been seen as second in seniority only to the Prime Minister in the Union Cabinet. Like Patel, several Home Ministers have since held the additional portfolio of Deputy Prime Minister. As of February 2020, three Home Ministers have gone on to become the Prime Minister: Lal Bahadur Shastri, Charan Singh and P. V. Narasimha Rao. L.K. Advani, serving from 19 March 1998 to 22 May 2004, has held the office of the Home Minister for the longest continuous period, as of February 2020.

From 26 May 2014 to 30 May 2019, the Home Minister of India was Rajnath Singh of the Bharatiya Janata Party, taking over the reins from Sushilkumar Shinde. On 31 May 2019, following the swearing-in of the Second Modi Ministry  Amit Shah assumed the office as its 31st occupant.

Central Armed Police Forces and domestic intelligence agency 
Chiefs of CAPFs, NIA and IB report directly to the Home Minister. DGs of CAPFs may also report to Special Secretary (Internal Security) and Special Secretary/Additional Secretary (Border Management).

List of Home Ministers

List of Ministers of State

Department of Home (State Ministers)

References

Srinivas.G
7899227799

External links
Home Ministry, Govt. of India
Amit Shah take charge of Home Ministry of India 2019

Home Affairs
Ministers of Internal Affairs by country
Lists of government ministers of India